Rab Dhuure, also known as Rabdhure, is a town in the southwestern Bakool region of Somalia.

Overview
Rab Dhuure serves as the center of the Rabdhure District.

In March 2014, Somali Armed Forces assisted by an Ethiopian battalion with AMISOM captured the town from Al-Shabaab. The offensive was part of an intensified military operation by the allied forces to remove the insurgent group from the remaining areas in southern Somalia under its control.

According to Prime Minister Abdiweli Sheikh Ahmed, the government subsequently launched stabilization efforts in the newly liberated areas, which also included Hudur, Wajid and Burdhubo. The Ministry of Defence was providing ongoing reassurance and security to the local residents, and supplying logistical and security support to deliver relief assistance. Additionally, the Ministry of Interior was prepared to support and put into place programs to assist local administration and security. A Deputy Minister and several religious scholars were also dispatched to all four towns to coordinate and supervise the federal government's stabilization initiatives.

Demographics
The broader Rabdhure District has a total population of 37,652 residents.

Notes

References
Rab Dhuure

Populated places in Bakool